Nida Khan is a prominent women's rights activist in India. After her personal experiences in dealing with triple talaq, she was encouraged to fight for the rights of Muslim women. In addition, she also fights for the rights of women who have become victim to the practice called Nikah Halala. A fatwa was issued by a Shahar Imam Mufti Khurshid Alam calling for social boycott of Khan for speaking out against Islamic practices.

Nida Khan got married on February 18, 2015, after which she was pressured for dowry. While taking her masters exam, she was dragged away from the examination center by her husband for which she was given the title of “Indian Malala”. Her husband beat her so badly that she had a miscarriage, and she subsequently has called her ex-husband her child's "murderer". Her husband gave her a triple talaq, or an instant divorce, and she was kicked out of the home on July 17 of 2015. After her ex-husband threatened her in May 2016 after telling the family of someone he was going to marry about her experience, Khan decided to take the matter to the police. The police refused to register her complaint and only did so after a court order.

Following her divorce, she had to enter into wedlock with her father-in-law and brother-in-law and consummate their marriage so that they could undergo the process of nikah halala which would allow her to remarry her first husband. She then refused and wrote to UP CM Yogi Adityanath to abolish that law because she believed it to be an "evil" practice to dissolve marriages.

She has now started a non-profit called Ala Hazrat Helping Society, which helps Muslim women deal with issues of triple talaq, domestic violence, polygamy and other cultural practices.

References

Indian women activists
Indian Muslims
Indian feminists
Violence against women in India